The 2004 SEC Championship Game was played on December 4, 2004, in the Georgia Dome in Atlanta, Georgia. The game matched SEC Western Division champion Auburn against SEC Eastern Division champion Tennessee.  The game was a 38–28 victory for Auburn.

Game summary

Scoring summary

Game statistics

See also 
 Auburn–Tennessee football rivalry

References 

SEC Championship
SEC Championship Game
Auburn Tigers football games
Tennessee Volunteers football games
December 2004 sports events in the United States
2004 in sports in Georgia (U.S. state)
2004 in Atlanta